Marco Hödl (born 10 January 1997) is an Austrian football player. He plays for USK Anif.

Club career
He made his Austrian Football First League debut for FC Liefering on 24 July 2015 in a game against SK Austria Klagenfurt.

References

External links
 

1997 births
Living people
Austrian footballers
Austria youth international footballers
FC Liefering players
TSV Hartberg players
2. Liga (Austria) players
Association football forwards